Hewlett Harbor is a village in Nassau County, on Long Island, in New York, United States. The population was 1,263 as of the 2010 census.

The Village of Hewlett Harbor is located within the Town of Hempstead. This area, like Back/Old Lawrence is unique because its rural affluence is similar in character to the more well-known Gold Coast of the North Shore instead of being more urbanized like the rest of the South Shore of Nassau County.

History 
Prominent attorney Joseph Auerbach (for whom Auerbach Avenue is named) purchased large amounts of land in what would eventually become Hewlett Harbor in 1914. Auerbach, on this land, soon erected a summer home, in addition to what would become the Seawane Country Club.

Following Auerbach's sale of the country club in the 1920s, the new owners had large amounts of the club's excess land developed, with the land being subdivided and zoned for single-family residential homes.

In 1925, Hewlett Harbor incorporated as a village.

Geography

Demographics

As of the census of 2000, there were 1,271 people, 429 households, and 380 families residing in the village. The population density was 1,754.3 people per square mile (681.6/km2). There were 437 housing units at an average density of 603.2 per square mile (234.3/km2). The racial makeup of the village was 95.12% White, 0.39% African American, 0.16% Native American, 3.15% Asian, 0.63% from other races, and 0.55% from two or more races. Hispanic or Latino of any race were 1.10% of the population.

There were 429 households, out of which 39.6% had children under the age of 18 living with them, 84.4% were married couples living together, 2.8% had a female householder with no husband present, and 11.4% were non-families. 10.0% of all households were made up of individuals, and 8.4% had someone living alone who was 65 years of age or older. The average household size was 2.96 and the average family size was 3.16.

In the village, the population was spread out, with 29.3% under the age of 18, 3.8% from 18 to 24, 19.8% from 25 to 44, 28.7% from 45 to 64, and 18.3% who were 65 years of age or older. The median age was 43 years. For every 100 females, there were 90.8 males. For every 100 females age 18 and over, there were 90.7 males.

The median income for a household in the village was $159,682, and the median income for a family was $185,962. Males had a median income of $100,000 versus $40,000 for females. The per capita income for the village was $82,069. None of the families and 0.7% of the population were living below the poverty line, including no under eighteens and 0.9% of those over 64.

Government

Village government 

As of August 2022, the Mayor of Hewlett Harbor is Mark Weiss, the Deputy Mayor is Leonard Oppenheimer, and the Trustees are Gil Bruh, Thomas Cohen, and Kenneth Kornblau.

Representation in higher government

Town representation 
Hewlett Harbor is located in the Town of Hempstead's 3rd Council District, which as of August 2022 is represented on the Hempstead Town Council by Melissa Miller (R–Atlantic Beach).

County representation 
Hewlett Harbor is located in Nassau County's 7th Legislative district, which as of August 2022 is represented in the Nassau County Legislature by Howard J. Kopel (R–Lawrence).

New York State representation

New York State Assembly 
Hewlett Harbor is located in the New York State Assembly's 20th Assembly district, which as of August 2022 is represented by Ari Brown (R–Cedarhurst).

New York State Senate 
Hewlett Harbor is located in the New York State Senate's 9th State Senate district, which as of August 2022 lacks an elected senator, due to the resignation of Todd Kaminsky (D–Long Beach) from the New York State Senate on July 29, 2022.

Federal representation

United States Congress 
Hewlett Harbor is located in New York's 4th Congressional District, which as of August 2022 is represented in the United States Congress by Kathleen M. Rice (D–Garden City).

United States Senate 
Like the rest of New York, Hewlett Harbor is represented in the United States Senate by Charles Schumer (D) and Kirsten Gillibrand (D).

Politics 
In the 2020 U.S. presidential election, the majority of Hewlett Harbor voters voted for Donald Trump (R).

Education

School districts 
The Village of Hewlett Harbor is primarily located within the boundaries of (and is thus served by) the Hewlett-Woodmere Union Free School District, while a smaller section is located within the boundaries of (and is thus served by) the Lynbrook Union Free School District. As such, children who reside within Hewlett Harbor and attend public schools go to school in one of these two districts, depending on where they reside within the village.

Additionally, some maritime portions of Hewlett Harbor are located within the boundaries of the Oceanside Union Free School District. However, no land within the village is within its boundaries, and as such, it does not serve any homes within the village.

Library districts 
Hewlett Harbor is located within the boundaries of (and is thus served by) the East Rockaway Library District and the Hewlett-Woodmere Library District. These two districts serve the areas of the village located within the Lynbrook Union Free School District and the Hewlett-Woodmere Union Free School District, respectively; the boundaries of these two districts roughly correspond with those of the Hewlett-Woodmere UFSD and Lynbrook UFSD within Hewlett Harbor.

Additionally, some maritime portions of Hewlett Harbor are located within the boundaries of the Oceanside Library District; the boundaries of the district within Hewlett Harbor overlap with the Oceanside Union Free School District's boundaries. However, no land within the village is within its boundaries, and as such, it does not serve any homes within the village.

Infrastructure

Transportation

Road 
Major roads either partially or wholly within the village include Auerbach Avenue, East Rockaway Road, Everit Avenue, Harbor Road, Pepperidge Road, and Seawane Drive.

Additionally, the village-maintained Mallow Reach Bridge is located entirely within the village, spanning Mallow Reach and the Auerbach Canal.

Rail 
No rail service passes through Hewlett Harbor. The nearest Long Island Rail Road station to the village is Hewlett on the Far Rockaway Branch.

Bus 
No bus routes pass through the village.

Utilities

Natural gas 
National Grid USA provides natural gas to homes and businesses that are hooked up to natural gas lines in Hewlett Harbor.

Power 
PSEG Long Island provides power to all homes and businesses within Hewlett Harbor.

Sewage 
Hewlett Harbor, in its entirety, is served by the Nassau County Sewage District's sanitary sewer network.

Trash collection 
Trash collection services in Hewlett Harbor are provided by the Town of Hempstead's Sanitation District 1.

Water 
The water supply in Hewlett Harbor is provided by New York American Water.

Notable residents
Notable current and former residents of Hewlett Harbor include:
 Maurice M. Black (1918-1996), pathologist who was an expert on breast cancer.
 Ross Bleckner (born 1949), artist.
 Robert DiBernardo (1937-1986), member of the Gambino crime family.
 Pamela Geller, political activist and author.
 Stan Lee (1922-2018), former Marvel Comics editor and creator.
 William Modell (1921–2008), chairman of the Modell's Sporting Goods retail chain.
 Errol Morris (born 1948), Oscar-winning film director, best known for documentaries. 
 George H. Ross (born 1928), executive vice president and senior counsel of the Trump Organization; judge on the television program The Apprentice.
 Jim Steinman (1947-2021) Songwriter of hits including "Total Eclipse of the Heart" and Meat Loaf's "Bat Out of Hell".
 Jonathan Tiomkin (born 1979), Olympic foil fencer.

In popular culture 
The village of Hewlett Harbor was specifically mentioned by TV personality Johnny "Drama" Chase on HBO's Entourage on the Sunday, May 13, 2007 episode entitled "The Resurrection". On Entourage, Drama stars in a fictional NBC TV series called Five Towns. The series' name is a reference to the real "Five Towns", an informal grouping of villages and hamlets located on Long Island, New York's South Shore of western Nassau County. "The Hewletts" (Hewlett, Hewlett Harbor, Hewlett Bay Park, and Hewlett Neck) are generally grouped together as one of the "Five Towns," with the other four being Woodmere, Cedarhurst, Lawrence, and Inwood, along with Woodsburgh. The fictional Five Towns series is produced by actor/screenwriter/producer Ed Burns (who plays himself on Entourage), who grew up in the Hewlett area and attended George W. Hewlett High School.

On the episode aired on April 13, it was said that the Village of Hewlett Harbor was the setting of the fictional NBC TV series called Five Towns.

See also
Seawane Country Club

References

External links

 Official website

Five Towns
Villages in New York (state)
Villages in Nassau County, New York
Populated coastal places in New York (state)